Sir George Gresley, 1st Baronet (c. 1580 – 1651) was an English landowner and politician who sat in the House of Commons from 1628 to 1629.

Gresley was the son of Sir Thomas Gresley of Drakelow, Derbyshire and his second wife Katherine Walsingham, daughter of Sir Thomas Walsingham, of Scadbury, Kent. He matriculated at Balliol College, Oxford in November 1594, aged 14 and was a student of Inner Temple in 1598. In September 1610 he succeeded to the estate of Drakelow on the death of his father. He was created baronet on 29 June 1611, and was subsequently knighted on 3 June 1612.

In 1628, Gresley was elected Member of Parliament for Newcastle-under-Lyme and sat until 1629 when King Charles decided to rule without parliament for eleven years. He was appointed Sheriff of Derbyshire by Parliament in 1644. Gresley was a great patron of learning.

Gresley died at the age of about 70 and was buried in the Temple Church, London on 5 February 1651.

Gresley married Susan Ferrers, daughter of Sir Humphrey Ferrers of Tamworth, Warwickshire and his wife Anne Bradborne, daughter of Sir Humphrey Bradborne, at Walton-on-Trent on 17 December 1600.

References

Births circa 1580
1651 deaths
Baronets in the Baronetage of England
English landowners
Alumni of Balliol College, Oxford
Members of the Inner Temple
High Sheriffs of Derbyshire
English MPs 1628–1629
People from South Derbyshire District
Members of the Parliament of England for Newcastle-under-Lyme
Year of birth uncertain